Sebastián Gastón Merlo (born 26 January 1985 in Jovita, Córdoba, Argentina), also referred to as Đỗ Merlo (in Vietnamese), is an Argentine-Vietnamese former footballer who played as a striker, most notably for SHB Đà Nẵng.

Club career
Merlo was one of the best goalscorers in the V-League (Vietnam). He won the league's top scorer award three times in a row from 2009 to 2011. He also won the league's best foreign player award in 2009 and 2011.

After taking a year to recover from a leg injury in his native Argentina, Merlo rejoined SHB Đà Nẵng in February 2016.

In June 2017, he was granted Vietnamese citizenship and got a new name, Đỗ Merlo

On June 7, 2020, he has headed a goal and this is also his first goal at Vleague when he left his very familiar club named SHB Da Nang.

Honours

Clubs

SHB Đà Nẵng F.C.
V.League 1
 Winners : 2009, 2012,
 Runners-up : 2013
Vietnamese Super Cup
 Winners : 2013
Vietnamese National Cup
 Winners : 2009
AFC Cup    :
Quarter-finals 2010 AFC Cup

Individuals
V.League 1 Top scorer: 2009, 2010, 2011, 2016

Career statistics

Club

References

External links
 Gastón Merlo Interview

1985 births
Living people
Footballers from Buenos Aires
Association football forwards
Argentine footballers
Argentine expatriate footballers
Expatriate footballers in Vietnam
Argentine expatriate sportspeople in Vietnam
SHB Da Nang FC players
Ferro Carril Oeste footballers
Primera Nacional players
V.League 1 players